Aggadah ( ʾAggāḏā or  Haggāḏā; Jewish Babylonian Aramaic: אַגָּדְתָא ʾAggāḏəṯāʾ; "tales, fairytale, lore") is the non-legalistic exegesis which appears in the classical rabbinic literature of Judaism, particularly the Talmud and Midrash. In general, Aggadah is a compendium of rabbinic texts that incorporates folklore, historical anecdotes, moral exhortations, and practical advice in various spheres, from business to medicine.

Etymology 

The Hebrew word haggadah (הַגָּדָה) is derived from the Hebrew root נגד, meaning "declare, make known, expound", also known from the common Hebrew verb להגיד.

The majority scholarly opinion is that the Hebrew word aggadah (אַגָּדָה) and corresponding Aramaic aggadta (אַגָּדְתָא) are variants of haggadah based on a common linguistic shift from haphalah to aphalah forms. However, a minority of scholars believe that these words derive from a separate Aramaic root נגד meaning "draw, pull, spread, stretch" (corresponding to the Hebrew root משך or נטה). 

According to the latter etymology, aggadah may be seen as "the part of the Torah which draws man towards its teachings", or the teachings which strengthen one's religious experience and spiritual connections, in addition to explaining texts.

As part of the Oral Torah

The Aggadah is part of Judaism's Oral Torah, the traditions providing the authoritative interpretation of the Written Torah. In this context, the widely-held view in rabbinic literature is that the Aggadah is in fact a medium for the transmission of fundamental teachings (Homiletic Sayings—) or for explanations of verses in the Hebrew Bible (Exegetic Sayings—). Rabbinic thought, therefore, understands much of the Aggadah as containing a hidden, allegorical dimension, in addition to its overt, literal sense. In general, where a literal interpretation contradicts rationality, the rabbis seek an allegorical explanation: "We are told to use our common sense to decide whether an aggada is to be taken literally or not" (Carmell, 2005).

Literal-allegorical teachings

Rabbi Moshe Chaim Luzzatto (1707-1746), discusses this two-tiered, literal-allegorical mode of transmission of the Aggadah in his well-known Discourse on the Haggadot. He explains that the Oral Law, in fact, comprises two components: the legal component, discussing the  mitzvot and halakha; and "the secret" component, discussing the deeper teachings. The Aggadah, along with the Kabbalah, falls under the latter. The rabbis of the Mishnahic era ( 10 to  CE) believed that it would be dangerous to record the deeper teachings in explicit, mishnah-like, medium. Rather, they would be conveyed in a "concealed mode" and via "paradoxes". (Due to their value, these teachings should not become accessible to those "of bad character"; and due to their depth they should not be made available to those "not schooled in the ways of analysis".) This mode of transmission nevertheless depended on consistent rules and principles such that those "equipped with the keys" would be able to unlock their meaning; to others they would appear as non-rational or fantastic.

Interpretation of the Aggadah
In line with the above, Samuel ibn Naghrillah (993-1056), in his "Introduction to the Talmud", states that "Aggadah comprises any comment occurring in the Talmud on any topic which is not a  commandment (i.e. which is not  halachic) and one should derive from it only that which is reasonable." As regards this, Maimonides (1138-1204), in his preface to the tenth chapter of  Tractate Sanhedrin (Perek Chelek), describes three possible approaches to the interpretation of the Aggadah:
 The first approach is to accept the Aggadah as literally true, without admission of any hidden, allegorical explanation—even where a literal interpretation runs counter to common sense. Maimonides treats this approach dismissively.
 The second approach assumes that anything said by the Sages was intended literally, and  therefore rejects as impossible the non-rational or fantastic teachings (and consequently regards the Sages as "simpletons and ignoramuses"). Maimonides does not entirely reject rationalist interpretation, but he opposes an  exegetical approach which denies the Aggadah a hidden rationality. "The sages presented their drashot in a style by which the mind of a fool will reject them because of his way of thinking; it is improper to assign any deficiency to the drash—one may rather suspect that the deficiency is a result of his intellectual shortcomings" (Commentary on the Mishnah: Introduction).
 The third approach involves recognising that many Aggadot are intended to teach profound truths, and that the teachings thus operate on two levels: "overt" and "hidden". Thus any impossible assertion was, in fact, intended as a parable; further, where aggadot can be understood literally, they may be taken on this level. This is, in general, the view of the Rabbis. "It is proper ... to carefully analyse [the Aggadot] ... when any of these seem far-fetched we must immerse ourselves in the various branches of knowledge until we understand the concepts." (Maimonides, op cit.)

Note that Maimonides' approach is also widely held amongst the non-rationalistic, mystical streams of Judaism—thus, for example, Rabbi Isaiah Horowitz, the Shlah HaKodosh (-1630) holds that "none of these sometimes mind-boggling 'stories' are devoid of profound meaning; if anyone is devoid of understanding, it is the reader" (Shnei Luchos HaBris, introduction).
See also the Maharal's approach.

In the Talmud and Midrash
The Aggadah is today recorded in the Midrash and the Talmud.

In the Midrash, the aggadic and halakhic material are compiled as two distinct collections:

 The Aggadic Midrashim, generally, are explanatory aggadah, deriving the "sermonic implications" from the biblical text.
 The Halakhic Midrashim derive the laws from the text.

Many of the Torah commentaries, as well as the Targumim, interpret the Torah text in the light of Aggadic statements, particularly those in the Midrash, and hence contain much material on Aggadah interpretation.

Throughout the Talmud, aggadic and halakhic material are interwoven—legal material comprises around 90%. (Tractate Avoth, which has no gemara, deals exclusively with non-halakhic material, though it is not regarded as aggadic in that it focuses largely on character development.) The Talmudic Aggadah, generally, convey the "deeper teachings"—though in concealed mode, as discussed. The aggadic material in the Babylonian Talmud is also presented separately in Ein Yaakov, a compilation of the Aggadah together with commentaries.

Well-known works interpreting the Aggadot in the Talmud include:
 Chiddushei Aggados (Novellae on the Aggadot) by Samuel Edels "the Maharsha" (1555-1631).
 Chiddushei Aggados (Novellae on the Aggadot) by Judah Loew "the Maharal" (as well as many other works by Loew, especially Be'er ha-Golah).
 Yehoyada and MeKabtziel (names based on 2 Samuel 23:20) by Yosef Hayyim "the Ben Ish Chai".
 Beur Aggados (Clarification of the Aggadot) and Perush al Kamma Aggadot (Commentary on several Aggadot) by the Vilna Gaon.
 Ein Yaakov (En Jacob) Agada of the Babylonian Talmud by Rabbi Jacob ibn Habib (Translated into English, 1916, by Rabbi Zvi Hirsch Glick).
 Etz Yosef, Anaf Yosef and Yad Yosef - as well as others -  by Zundel ben Joseph
 Ein Ayah four volume commentary on Ein Yaakov by Rav Kook (1865-1935)

Development

The Aggadah has been preserved in a series of different works, which, like all works of traditional literature, have come to their present form through previous collections and revisions. Their original forms existed long before they were reduced to writing.

The first traces of the midrashic exegesis are found in the Bible itself; while in the time of the Soferim the development of the Midrash Aggadah received a mighty impetus, and the foundations were laid for public services which were soon to offer the chief medium for the cultivation of Bible exegesis.

Much Aggadah, often mixed with foreign elements, is found in the Apocrypha, the Pseudepigrapha, the works of Josephus and Philo, and the remaining Judæo-Hellenistic literature; but aggadic exegesis reached its highest development in the great epoch of the Mishnaic-Talmudic period, between 100 and 550 CE.

The Aggadah of the Amoraim (sages of the Talmud) is the continuation of that of the Tannaim (sages of the Mishna). The final edition of the Mishnah, which was of such signal importance for the Halakah, is of less significance for the Aggadah, which, in form as well as in content, shows the same characteristics in both periods.

Exegetic and homiletic Aggadah
It is important to emphasize the fundamental difference in plan between the midrashim forming a running commentary (מאמרים ביאוריים) to the Scripture text, and the homiletic midrashim (מאמרים לימודיים). When the scholars undertook to edit, revise, and collect into individual midrashim the immense array of haggadot, they followed the method employed in the collections and revisions of the halakhot and the halakhic discussions. The form which suggested itself was to arrange in textual sequence the exegetical interpretations of the Biblical text as taught in the schools, or the occasional interpretations introduced into public discourses, etc., and which were in any way connected with Scripture. Since the work of the editor was often merely that of compilation, the existing midrashim show in many passages the character of the sources from which they were taken. This was the genesis of the midrashim which are in the nature of running haggadic commentaries to single books of the Bible, as Bereshit Rabbah, Eikah Rabbati, the midrashim to the other Megillot, etc. See Midrash for more details.

Modern compilations
Ein Yaakov is a compilation of the aggadic material in the Babylonian Talmud together with commentary. It was compiled by Jacob ibn Habib and (after his death) by his son Levi ibn Habib, and was first published in Saloniki (Greece) in 1515. It was intended as a text of aggadah, that could be studied with "the same degree of seriousness as the Talmud itself".

Popularized anthologies did not appear until more recently—these often incorporate "aggadot" from outside of classical Rabbinic literature. The major works include:
 Sefer Ha-Aggadah (The Book of Legends) is a classic compilation of aggadah from the Mishnah, the two Talmuds and the Midrash literature. It was edited by Hayim Nahman Bialik and Yehoshua Hana Rawnitzki. Bialik and Ravnitzky worked for three years to compile a comprehensive and representative overview of aggadah. When they found the same aggadah in multiple versions, from multiple sources, they usually selected the later form, the one found in the Babylonian Talmud. However, they also presented some aggadot sequentially, giving the early form from the Jerusalem Talmud, and later versions from the Babylonian Talmud, and from a classic midrash compilation. In each case every aggadah is given with its original source. In their original edition, they translated the Aramaic aggadot into modern Hebrew. Sefer Ha-Aggadah was first published in 1908–1911 in Odessa, Russia, then reprinted numerous times in Israel. In 1992 it was translated into English as The Book of Legends, by William G. Braude.
 Legends of the Jews, by Rabbi Louis Ginzberg, is an original synthesis of a vast amount of aggadah from the Mishnah, the two Talmuds and Midrash. Ginzberg had an encyclopedic knowledge of all rabbinic literature, and his masterwork included a massive array of aggadot. However he did not create an anthology which showed these aggadot distinctly. Rather, he paraphrased them and rewrote them into one continuous narrative that covered five volumes, followed by two volumes of footnotes that give specific sources.
 Mimekor Yisrael, by Micha Josef Berdyczewski. Berdichevsky was interested in compiling the folklore and legends of the Jewish people, from the earliest times up until the dawn of the modern era. His collection included a large array of aggadot, although they were limited to those he considered within the domain of folklore.
 The collected works of Dov Noy.<ref>According to Peninnah Schram, "Dov Noy is the fourth major figure in the renaissance of preserving and perpetuating the Jewish oral tradition. While he has published many books and important essays (including the entry "Folklore" in the '"Encyclopaedia Judaica), his two main contributions are: 1) he applied an international classification system to Jewish traditional narrative; and 2) he established the Israel Folktale Archives"</ref> In 1954, Noy established the Israel Folktale Archives and Ethnological Museum at the University of Haifa, an archive containing over 23,000 folktales collected from all the various ethnic communities who live in Israel.

See also

 Aggadic Midrashim (category)
 Moses in rabbinic literature
 Pardes (Jewish exegesis)

References
Notes

Bibliography
 Traditional orientation
 Introduction to the commentary on the Mishnah, Maimonides, transl. Zvi Lampel (Judaica Press, 1998). 
 Discourse on the Haggadot, Moshe Chaim Luzzatto, transl. in "The Juggler and the King" below.
 The Infinite Chain: Torah, Masorah, and Man, Nathan Lopes Cardozo, (Philipp Feldheim, 1989). 
 The Juggler and the King, Aharon Feldman, (Philipp Feldheim, 1991). 
 The Talmud: A Reference Guide, Adin Steinsaltz, (Random House, 1996). 
 Modern
 Mimekor Yisrael: Classical Jewish Folktales, Micha Joseph bin Gorion, translated by I. M. Lask, Trans. Three volumes. Bloomington, Indiana University Press, 1976
 Mimekor Yisrael: Classical Jewish Folktales Abridged and Annotated Edition Micha Joseph bin Gorion. This is a one volume abridged and annotated version, with an introduction and headnotes, by Dan Ben-Amos. Indiana University Press. 560 pages. .
 Four Master Folklorists And Their Major Contributions Peninnah Schram, from Opening Worlds of Words'', Peninnah Schram and Cherie Karo Schwartz

External links
Discussion
 
 
 
 The Key to Understanding Aggadah, CB"N Library
 Freedom to Interpret, Rabbi Aryeh Carmell
 Understanding Aggadah, Rabbi Gil Student
 The Midrash: Introduction, Samuel Rapaport

Source material
 Introduction to Perek Chelek, Maimonides
 Discussion on Aggadah in the Introduction to the Commentary on the Mishna, Maimonides
 Discourse on the Haggadot , Moshe Chaim Luzzatto
 Discourse on the Sayings of the Rabbis , Avraham son of Rambam—translation

Textual resources
 Links to full-text resources
 Ben Gurion University
 Halacha Brura Institute
 Excerpted translations
 The Legends of the Jews by Louis Ginzberg
 Tales and Maxims from the Midrash by Samuel Rapaport

 
Ancient Hebrew texts
Articles which contain graphical timelines
Jewish folklore
Jewish philosophy
Jewish theology
Oral Torah